The 1933–34 season was the 36th in the history of the Southern League. The league consisted of Eastern and Western Divisions. Norwich City reserves won the Eastern Division for the second successive season, whilst Plymouth Argyle reserves won the Western Division. Plymouth reserves were declared Southern League champions after winning a championship play-off replay 3–0 after a 2–2 draw in the first match.

Folkestone were the only Southern League to apply to join the Football League, but received no votes in the election.

Eastern Division

A total of 9 teams contest the division, including 8 sides from previous season and two new teams.

Newly elected teams:
 Margate
 Clapton Orient II

Western Division

There were no new clubs in the Western Division this season.

Football League election
Folkestone were the only Southern League club to apply for election to Division Three South of the Football League. However, they received no votes and the two League clubs were re-elected.

References

1933-34
4
1933–34 in Welsh football